The Rosebuds Unwind is The Rosebuds' first EP, released in 2003.

Track listing
 "You Better Get Ready *"
 "El Camino **"
 "Is There Room? **"
 "Unwind"
 "Edmund Street **"
 "I'd Feel Better **"

Personnel
 Kelly Crisp – Stieff piano, keyboards, Fender Rhodes, bass keys, bass guitar, lap steel, shakers, vocals
 Ivan Howard – guitars, Stieff piano
 Wes Phillips- drums
 Billy Alphin – drums, extra vocals on "I'd Feel Better"

References

2005 EPs
The Rosebuds albums
Merge Records EPs